The Rough Diamond is a 1921 American silent Western comedy film directed by Edward Sedgwick and starring Tom Mix, Eva Novak and Hector V. Sarno.

Cast
 Tom Mix as Hank Sherman
 Eva Novak as Gloria Gómez
 Hector V. Sarno as Emeliano Gómez 
 Ed Brady as Pedro Sachet 
 Sid Jordan as Manuel Garcia

References

Bibliography
 Connelly, Robert B. The Silents: Silent Feature Films, 1910-36, Volume 40, Issue 2. December Press, 1998.
 Munden, Kenneth White. The American Film Institute Catalog of Motion Pictures Produced in the United States, Part 1. University of California Press, 1997.
 Solomon, Aubrey. The Fox Film Corporation, 1915-1935: A History and Filmography. McFarland, 2011.

External links
 

1921 films
1921 Western (genre) films
American silent feature films
Silent American Western (genre) films
American black-and-white films
1920s English-language films
Films directed by Edward Sedgwick
Fox Film films
1920s American films